Deborah Mary Peterson (born August 22, 1961) is an American musician and the drummer of the band The Bangles. She sang lead vocals on two of the band's released singles, "Going Down to Liverpool" (1984) and "Be with You" (1989). She is the younger sister of fellow Bangles member Vicki Peterson.

She had already established her first band in high school and started a solo career after the separation of The Bangles in 1990. In 1992, she formed the short-lived duo Kindred Spirit with Siobhan Maher, formerly of River City People.

Peterson has been married to sound engineer Steven Botting since 1989.  They have two children.

References

External links

1961 births
Living people
American women singers
The Bangles members
Musicians from Los Angeles
American rock drummers
American women drummers
20th-century American drummers
20th-century American women musicians